Columbo is an American crime drama television series starring Peter Falk as Lieutenant Columbo, a homicide detective with the Los Angeles Police Department. After two pilot episodes in 1968 and 1971, the show originally aired on NBC from 1971 to 1978 as one of the rotating programs of The NBC Mystery Movie. Columbo then aired less frequently on ABC from 1989 to 2003.

Columbo is a shrewd and intelligent blue-collar homicide detective whose trademarks include his rumpled beige raincoat, unassuming demeanor, cigar, old Peugeot 403 car, love of chili con carne, and unseen wife (whom he mentions frequently). He often leaves a room only to return with the catchphrase "Just one more thing" to ask a critical question.

The character and show, created by Richard Levinson and William Link, popularized the inverted detective story format (sometimes referred to as a "howcatchem"). This genre begins by showing the commission of the crime and its perpetrator; the plot therefore usually has no "whodunit" element of determining which of several suspects committed the crime. It instead revolves around how a perpetrator known to the audience will finally be caught and exposed.

The series' homicide suspects are often affluent members of high society; it has led some critics to see class conflict as an element of each story. Suspects carefully cover their tracks and are initially dismissive of Columbo's circumstantial speech and apparent ineptitude. They become increasingly unsettled as his superficially pestering behavior teases out incriminating evidence. His relentless approach often leads to self-incrimination or outright confession.

Episodes of Columbo are between 70 and 98 minutes long, and they have been broadcast in 44 countries. The show has been described by the BBC as "timeless" and remains popular today.

Episodes

After two pilot episodes, the show originally aired on NBC from 1971 to 1978 as one of the rotating programs of The NBC Mystery Movie. Columbo then aired less regularly on ABC beginning in 1989 under the umbrella of The ABC Mystery Movie. The last episode was broadcast in 2003 as part of ABC Thursday Night at the Movies.

In almost every episode, the audience sees the crime unfold at the beginning and knows the identity of the culprit, typically an affluent member of society. Once Columbo enters the story (he rarely appears in the first act), viewers watch him solve the case by sifting through the contradictions between the truth and the version presented to him by the killer(s). This style of mystery is sometimes referred to as a "howcatchem", in contrast to the traditional whodunit. In structural analysis terms, the majority of the narrative is therefore dénouement, a feature normally reserved for the very end of a story. Episodes tend to be driven by their characters, the audience observing the criminal's reactions to Columbo's increasingly intrusive presence. The explanation for the crime and its method having played out as part of the narrative, most of the stories simply end with the criminal's reaction at being found out.

When Columbo first appears in an episode, his genius is hidden by his frumpy, friendly, and disarming demeanor, luring the killer into a false sense of security. In some cases, the killer's arrogance and dismissive attitude allow Columbo to manipulate his suspects into self-incrimination. While the details, and eventually the motivations, of the murderers' actions are shown to the viewer, Columbo's true thoughts and intentions are almost never revealed until close to the end of the episode (he occasionally begins to whistle the tune "This Old Man" as the pieces begin to fall into place). Columbo generally maintains a friendly relationship with the murderer until the end. The point at which the detective first begins to suspect the murderer is generally not revealed, although it is often fairly early on. There are two sides to Columbo's character: the disarming and unkempt detective and the hidden genius sleuth. The genius sometimes starkly manifests itself through his eyes, as when Jack Cassidy's magician, The Great Santini, manages to escape from police handcuffs that Columbo coyly presents him during Santini's show ("Now You See Him..."). Such moments always bode bad tidings for the killer. In some instances, such as Ruth Gordon's avenging elderly mystery writer in "Try and Catch Me", Janet Leigh's terminally ill and deluded actress in "Forgotten Lady", Donald Pleasence's elegant vintner in "Any Old Port in a Storm", and Johnny Cash's enserfed singer in "Swan Song", the killer is more sympathetic than the victim.

Each case is generally concluded in a similar style, with Columbo dropping any pretense of uncertainty and sharing details of his conclusion of the killer's guilt. Following the killer's reaction, the episode generally ends with the killer confessing or quietly submitting to arrest. There are few attempts to deceive the viewer or provide a twist in the tale. One convoluted exception is "Last Salute to the Commodore", where Robert Vaughn is seen elaborately disposing of a body, but is proved later to have been covering for his alcoholic wife, whom he mistakenly thought to be the murderer. Sometimes, Columbo sets up the murderer with a trick designed to elicit a confession. An example occurs in "Dagger of the Mind", in which Columbo flips an evidentiary pearl into the victim's umbrella, bringing about incriminating activity from Richard Basehart and Honor Blackman. Oddly, the Hallmark Channel's replay of the episode (2020) edits out the revealing scene, thus completely altering the meaning of the ending of the episode.

Development and character profile

The character of Columbo was created by the writing team of Richard Levinson and William Link, who said that Columbo was partially inspired by Fyodor Dostoevsky's Crime and Punishment character Porfiry Petrovich, as well as G. K. Chesterton's humble cleric-detective Father Brown. Other sources claim Columbo's character is also influenced by Inspector Fichet from the French suspense-thriller film Les Diaboliques (1955).

The character first appeared in a 1960 episode of the television-anthology series The Chevy Mystery Show, titled "Enough Rope". This was adapted by Levinson and Link from their short story "May I Come In", which had been published as "Dear Corpus Delicti" in an issue of Alfred Hitchcock's Mystery Magazine. The short story featured a police lieutenant then named Fisher. The first actor to portray Columbo, character actor Bert Freed, was a stocky character actor with a thatch of gray hair.

Freed's Columbo wore a rumpled suit and smoked a cigar; he otherwise had few of the other now-familiar Columbo mannerisms. The character is still recognizably Columbo and uses some of the same methods of misdirecting and distracting his suspects. During the course of the show, the increasingly frightened murderer brings pressure from the district attorney's office to have Columbo taken off the case, but the detective fights back with his own contacts.

Although Freed received third billing, he wound up with almost as much screen time as the killer and appeared immediately after the first commercial. This delayed entry of the character into the narrative of the screen play became a defining characteristic of the structure of the Columbo series. This teleplay is available for viewing in the archives of the Paley Center for Media in New York City and Los Angeles.

Levinson and Link then adapted the TV drama into the stage play Prescription: Murder. This was first performed at the Curran Theatre in San Francisco on January 2, 1962, with Oscar-winning character actor Thomas Mitchell in the role of Columbo. Mitchell was 70 years old at the time. The stage production starred Joseph Cotten as the murderer and Agnes Moorehead as the victim. Mitchell died of cancer while the play was touring in out-of-town tryouts; Columbo was his last role.

In 1968, the same play was made into a two-hour television movie that aired on NBC. The writers suggested Lee J. Cobb and Bing Crosby for the role of Columbo, but Cobb was unavailable and Crosby turned it down because he felt it would take too much time away from the golf links. Director Richard Irving convinced Levinson and Link that Falk, who excitedly said he "would kill to play that cop", could pull it off even though he was much younger than the writers had in mind.

Originally a one-off TV-Movie-of-the-Week, Prescription: Murder has Falk's Columbo pitted against a psychiatrist (Gene Barry). In this movie, the psychiatrist gives the new audience a perfect description of Columbo's character. Due to the success of this film, NBC requested that a pilot for a potential series be made to see if the character could be sustained on a regular basis, leading to the 1971 90-minute television production, Ransom for a Dead Man, with Lee Grant playing the killer. The popularity of the second film prompted the creation of a regular series on NBC, that premiered in September 1971 as part of The NBC Mystery Movie wheel series rotation: McCloud, McMillan & Wife, and other whodunits.

According to TV Guide, the original plan was that a new Columbo episode would air every week. However, Falk refused to commit to such a busy schedule given his steady work in motion pictures. The network arranged for the Columbo segments to air once a month on Wednesday nights. The high quality of Columbo, McMillan & Wife, and McCloud was due in large part to the extra time spent on each episode. The term wheel show had been previously coined to describe this format, but no previous or subsequent wheel show achieved the longevity or success of The NBC Mystery Movie.

Columbo was an immediate hit in the Nielsen ratings and Falk won an Emmy Award for his role in the show's first season. In its second year the Mystery Movie series was moved to Sunday nights, where it then remained during its seven-season run. The show became the anchor of NBC's Sunday night lineup. Columbo aired regularly from 1971 to 1978. After NBC canceled it in 1978, Columbo was revived on ABC between 1989 and 2003 in several new seasons and a few made-for-TV movie "specials".

Columbo's wardrobe was provided by Falk; they were his clothes, including the high-topped shoes and the shabby raincoat, which made its first appearance in Prescription: Murder. Falk often ad libbed his character's idiosyncrasies (fumbling through his pockets for a piece of evidence and discovering a grocery list, asking to borrow a pencil, becoming distracted by something irrelevant in the room at a dramatic point in a conversation with a suspect, etc.), inserting these into his performance as a way to keep his fellow actors off-balance. He felt it helped to make their confused and impatient reactions to Columbo's antics more genuine. According to Levinson, the catchphrase "one more thing" was conceived when he and Link were writing the play: "we had a scene that was too short, and we had already had Columbo make his exit. We were too lazy to retype the scene, so we had him come back and say, 'Oh, just one more thing.' It was never planned." The catchphrase became the basis for a well-known sales technique known as the "Columbo Close". In this, after the sales person has completed their sales pitch without success and the customer is about to walk away, the sales person uses Columbo's line to present the customer with the most enticing part of their offer.

A few years before his death, Falk expressed interest in returning to the role. In 2007, he claimed he had chosen a script for one last Columbo episode, "Columbo: Hear No Evil". The script was renamed "Columbo's Last Case". ABC declined the project. In response, producers for the series announced that they were attempting to shop the project to foreign production companies. Falk was diagnosed with dementia in late 2007. During a 2009 trial over his care, physician Stephen Read stated that Falk's condition had deteriorated so badly that he could no longer remember playing a character named Columbo, nor could he identify Columbo. Falk died on June 23, 2011, aged 83.

Contributors

Guest stars 
The series featured many guest stars as murderers and in other roles.

Some actors appeared more than once, playing a different character each time; among those actors are Jack Cassidy, Robert Culp, Tyne Daly, George Hamilton, Martin Landau, Patrick McGoohan and William Shatner.

Famous actors who appeared on the show included:
 Eddie Albert as Maj. Gen. Martin Hollister (Episode: Dead Weight)
 Don Ameche as Frank Simpson (Episode: Suitable for Framing)
 Lew Ayres as Dr. Howard Nicholson (Episode: Mind Over Mayhem)
 Gene Barry as Dr. Ray Fleming (Episode: Prescription: Murder)
 Kristin Bauer van Straten as Suzie Endicott (Episode: Undercover) 
 Anne Baxter as Nora Chandler (Episode: Requiem for a Falling Star)
 Ed Begley Jr. as Officer Stein (Episode: How to Dial a Murder), Irving Krutch (Episode: Undercover)
 Theodore Bikel as Oliver Brandt (Episode: The Bye-Bye Sky High IQ Murder Case)
 Honor Blackman as Lillian Stanhope (Episode: Dagger of the Mind)
 Sorrell Booke as Bertie Hastings (Episode: The Bye-Bye Sky High IQ Murder Case)
 Roscoe Lee Browne as Dr. Steadman (Episode: Rest in Peace, Mrs. Columbo)
 Johnny Cash as Tommy Brown (Episode: Swan Song)
 John Cassavetes as Alex Benedict (Episode: Étude in Black)
 Jack Cassidy as Ken Franklin (Episode: Murder by the Book), Riley Greenleaf (Episode: Publish or Perish), and The Great Santini (Episode: Now You See Him...)
 Kim Cattrall as Joanne Nicholls (Episode: How to Dial a Murder)
 Ron Cey as himself (Episode: Uneasy Lies the Crown)
 Susan Clark as Beth Chadwick (Episode: Lady in Waiting)
 Dabney Coleman as Sergeant Murray (Episode: Double Shock), Hugh Creighton (Episode: Columbo and the Murder of a Rock Star)
 Billy Connolly as Findlay Crawford (Episode: Murder With Too Many Notes)
 Jackie Cooper as Nelson Hayward (Episode: Candidate for Crime)
 Robert Culp as Carl Brimmer (Episode: Death Lends a Hand), Paul Hanlon (Episode: The Most Crucial Game), Dr. Bart Keppel (Episode: Double Exposure), and Jordan Rowe (Episode: Columbo Goes to College)
 Jamie Lee Curtis as an unnamed waitress (Episode: Bye-bye Sky High IQ)
 Tyne Daly as Dolores McCain (Episode: A Bird in the Hand...), Dorothea McNally (Episode: Undercover)
 Shera Danese Peter Falk's 2nd wife featured in small and supporting roles in 6 episodes (Episode: Fade in to Murder, Murder Under Glass, Murder A Self Portrait, Columbo and the Murder of a Rock Star, Undercover and A Trace of Murder)
 Blythe Danner as Janice Benedict (Episode: Étude in Black) 
 Faye Dunaway as Lauren Staton (Episode: It's All in the Game)
 Samantha Eggar as Vivian Brandt (Episode: The Bye-Bye Sky High IQ Murder Case)
 Héctor Elizondo as Hassan Salah (Episode: A Case of Immunity)
 Maurice Evans as Raymond (Episode: Forgotten Lady)
 José Ferrer as Dr. Marshall Cahill (Episode: Mind Over Mayhem)
 Mel Ferrer as Jerry Parks (Episode: Requiem for a Falling Star)
 Ruth Gordon as Abigail Mitchell (Episode: Try and Catch Me)
 Harold Gould as Agent Carlson (Episode: Ransom for a Dead Man) 
 Lee Grant as Leslie Williams (Episode: Ransom for a Dead Man)
 James Gregory as David Buckner (Episode: Short Fuse), Coach Rizzo (Episode: The Most Crucial Game)
 George Hamilton as Dr. Mark Collier (Episode: A Deadly State of Mind), Wade Anders (Episode: Caution: Murder Can Be Hazardous to Your Health)
 Valerie Harper as Eve Babcock (Episode: The Most Crucial Game)
 Laurence Harvey as Emmett Clayton (Episode: The Most Dangerous Match)
 Edith Head as herself (Episode: Requiem for a Falling Star)
 Kim Hunter as Edna Matthews (Episode: Suitable for Framing)
 Wilfrid Hyde-White as Tanner (Episode: Dagger of the Mind), Jonathan Kittering (Episode: Last Salute to the Commodore) 
 Dean Jagger as Walter Cunnell (Episode: The Most Crucial Game)
 Louis Jourdan as Paul Gerard (Episode: Murder Under Glass)
 Sally Kellerman as Liz Houston (Episode: Ashes to Ashes)
 Richard Kiley as Deputy Commissioner Mark Halperin (Episode: A Friend in Deed)
 Walter Koenig as Sgt. Johnson (Episode: Fade in to Murder) 
 Martin Landau as twins Dexter/Norman Paris (Episode: Double Shock)
 Janet Leigh as Grace Wheeler (Episode: Forgotten Lady)
 Robert Loggia as Harry Blandford (Episode: Now You See Him...)
 Myrna Loy as Lizzy Fielding (Episode: Étude in Black)
 Ida Lupino as Doris Buckner (Episode: Short Fuse), Edna Brown (Episode: Swan Song)
 Rue McClanahan as Verity Chandler (Episode: Ashes to Ashes)
 Roddy McDowall as Roger Stanford (Episode: Short Fuse)
 Patrick McGoohan as Colonel Lyle C. Rumford (Episode: By Dawn's Early Light), Nelson Brenner (Episode: Identity Crisis, and directed), Oscar Finch (Episode: Agenda for Murder, and directed), Eric Prince (Episode: Ashes to Ashes, and directed)
 Patrick MacNee as Captain Gibbon (Episode: Troubled Waters)
 Ian McShane as Leland St. John (Episode: Rest in Peace, Mrs. Columbo)
 Ross Martin as Dale Kingston (Episode: Suitable for Framing)
 Vera Miles as Viveca Scott (Episode: Lovely But Lethal)
 Ray Milland as Jarvis Goodland (Episode: The Greenhouse Jungle), Arthur Kennicutt (Episode: Death Lends a Hand)
 Sal Mineo as  Rachman Habib (Episode: A Case of Immunity)
 Ricardo Montalbán as Luís Montoya (Episode: A Matter of Honor)
 Pat Morita as The House Boy (Episode: Étude in Black)
 Julie Newmar as Lisa Chambers (Episode: Double Shock)
 Leslie Nielsen as Peter Hamilton (Episode: Lady in Waiting), Geronimo (Episode: Identity Crisis)
 Leonard Nimoy as Dr. Barry Mayfield (Episode: A Stitch in Crime)
 Nehemiah Persoff as Jesse Jerome (Episode: Now You See Him...)
 Donald Pleasence as Adrian Carsini (Episode: Any Old Port in a Storm)
 Suzanne Pleshette as Helen Stewart (Episode: Dead Weight)
 Vincent Price as David Lang (Episode: Lovely but Lethal)
 Clive Revill as Joe Devlin (Episode: The Conspirators)
 Matthew Rhys as Justin Price (Episode: Columbo Likes the Nightlife)
 Little Richard as himself (Episode: Columbo and the Murder of a Rock Star)
 Gena Rowlands as Elizabeth Van Wick (Episode: Playback)
 Katey Sagal as a secretary (Episode: Candidate for Crime)
 Dick Sargent as himself (Episode: Uneasy Lies the Crown)
 Steve Schirripa as Freddie (Episode: Columbo Likes the Nightlife)
 William Shatner as Ward Fowler (Episode: Fade in to Murder), Fielding Chase (Episode: Butterfly in Shades of Grey)
 Martin Sheen as Karl Lessing (Episode: Lovely but Lethal)
 Mickey Spillane as Alan Mallory (Episode: Publish or Perish)
 Rod Steiger as Vincenzo Fortelli (Episode: Strange Bedfellows)
 Dean Stockwell as Eric Wagner (Episode: The Most Crucial Game), Lloyd Harrington (Episode: Troubled Waters)
 Larry Storch as Mr. Weekly (Episode: Negative Reaction) 
 Vic Tayback as Sam Franklin (Episode: Suitable for Framing) 
 Rip Torn as Leon Lamarr (Episode: Death Hits the Jackpot)
 Forrest Tucker as Beau Williamson (Episode: Blueprint for Murder)
 Brenda Vaccaro as Jess McCurdy (Episode: Murder in Malibu)
 Dick Van Dyke as Paul Galesko (Episode: Negative Reaction)
 Robert Vaughn as Hayden Danziger (Episode: Troubled Waters), Charles Clay (Episode: Last Salute to the Commodore)
 Nancy Walker as herself (Episode: Uneasy Lies the Crown)
 Jessica Walter as Margaret Nicholson (Episode: Mind Over Mayhem)
 Leslie Ann Warren as Nadia Donner (Episode: A Deadly State of Mind)
 George Wendt as Graham McVeigh (Episode: Strange Bedfellows)
 Oskar Werner as Harold Van Wick (Episode: Playback)
 Mary Wickes as a landlady (Episode: Suitable for Framing)
 Nicol Williamson as Dr. Eric Mason (Episode: How To Dial A Murder)
 William Windom as Everett Logan (Episode: Short Fuse)
 Burt Young as Mo Weinberg (Episode: Undercover)

Directors and writers 

The first season première "Murder by the Book" was written by Steven Bochco and directed by Steven Spielberg. Jonathan Demme directed the seventh-season episode "Murder Under Glass". Jonathan Latimer was also a writer. Actor Ben Gazzara, a friend of Falk's, directed the episodes "A Friend in Deed" (1974) and "Troubled Waters" (1975).

Falk himself directed the last episode of the first season, "Blueprint for Murder," and wrote the episode entitled "It's All in the Game" in season 10. Actor Nicholas Colasanto, best known for playing Coach on Cheers, directed two episodes, "Swan Song" with Johnny Cash, and "Étude in Black".

Patrick McGoohan directed five episodes (including three of the four in which he played the murderer) and wrote and produced two. Vincent McEveety was a frequent director, and homage was paid to him by a humorous mention of a character with his surname in the episode "Undercover" (which he directed).

Two episodes, "No Time to Die" and "Undercover", were based on the 87th Precinct novels by Ed McBain, and thus do not strictly follow the standard Columbo/inverted detective story format.

Score composers 
Columbo episodes contain a variety of music that contributes to the uniqueness of each. The score becomes of particular importance during turning points of the plots. "The Mystery Movie Theme" by Henry Mancini, written for The NBC Mystery Movie series, was used extensively in the whole of 38 episodes, from 1971 to 1977. Unlike the other elements of the Mystery Movie wheel, Columbo never had an official theme as such, although some composers, such as Dick DeBenedictis and Gil Mellé, did write their own signature pieces. Several composers created original music for the series, which was often used along with "The Mystery Movie Theme":

 Dick DeBenedictis (23 episodes, 1972–2003)
 Patrick Williams (9 episodes, 1977–1992)
 Bernardo Segall (10 episodes, 1974–1976)
 Billy Goldenberg (7 episodes, 1971–1974)
 Gil Mellé (4 episodes, 1971–1972)
 Jeff Alexander (1 episode, 1975)
 Oliver Nelson (1 episode, 1972)
 Dave Grusin (1 episode, 1968)
 Robert Prince (1 episode, 1977)
 Jonathan Tunick (1 episode, 1978)
 John Cacavas (3 episodes, 1989–1991)
 James Di Pasquale (2 episodes, 1990)
 Steve Dorff (2 episodes, 1991)
 Dennis Dreith (1 episode, 1990)
 Richard Markowitz (1 episode, 1990)
 David Michael Frank (1 episode, 1990)
 The Crystal Method (1 episode, 2003)

Series Music department included:

 Quincy Jones—composer: "Mystery Movie" theme / "Wednesday Mystery Movie" theme (8 episodes, 1972–1973)
 Henry Mancini – composer: "Mystery Movie" theme / "Sunday Mystery Movie" theme (38 episodes, 1971–1977)
 Hal Mooney – music supervisor (27 episodes, 1972–1976)
 Mike Post – composer: "Mystery Movie" theme (9 episodes, 1989–1990)

Patrick Williams received two Emmys nominations for Outstanding Music Composition for a Series in 1978 (for "Try and Catch Me") and 1989 (for "Murder, Smoke and Shadows"). Billy Goldenberg was nominated in the same category in 1972 for "Lady in Waiting".

Columbo also featured an unofficial signature tune, the British children's song "This Old Man". It was introduced in the episode "Any Old Port in a Storm" in 1973 and the detective can be heard humming or whistling it often in subsequent films. Falk said it was a melody he personally enjoyed and one day it became a part of his character. The tune was also used in various score arrangements throughout the three decades of the series, including opening and closing credits. A version of it, titled "Columbo", was created by Patrick Williams.

The 1971 episode "Murder by the Book", directed by Steven Spielberg, was ranked No. 16 on TV Guide's 100 Greatest Episodes of All-Time and in 1999, the magazine ranked Lt. Columbo No. 7 on its 50 Greatest TV Characters of All Time list. In 2012, the program was ranked the third-best cop or legal show on Best in TV: The Greatest TV Shows of Our Time. In 2013, TV Guide included it in its list of The 60 Greatest Dramas of All Time and ranked it 33rd on its list of the 60 Best Series. Also in 2013, the Writers Guild of America ranked it 57th on its list of 101 Best Written TV Series.

Awards and nominations 
Columbo received numerous awards and nominations from 1971 to 2005, including 13 Emmys, two Golden Globe Awards, two Edgar Awards and a TV Land Award nomination in 2005 for Peter Falk.

Home media

DVD
As of January 10, 2012, Universal Studios had released all 69 episodes of Columbo on DVD. The episodes are released in the same chronological order as they were originally broadcast. On October 16, 2012, Universal released Columbo—The Complete Series on DVD in Region 1.

Because the Columbo episodes from 1989 to 2003 were aired very infrequently, different DVD sets have been released around the world. In many Region 2 and Region 4 countries, all episodes have now been released as 10 seasons, with the 10th comprising the last 14 episodes, from "Columbo Goes to College" (1990) to "Columbo Likes the Nightlife" (2003). In France and The Netherlands (also Region 2), the DVDs were grouped differently and released as 12 seasons.

In Region 1, all episodes from seasons 8 on are grouped differently; the episodes that originally aired on ABC were released under the title COLUMBO: The Mystery Movie Collection.

Blu-ray

The complete series was released on Blu-ray in Japan in 2011 as a ten-season set, taken from new HD masters and original 1.33:1 (4:3) aspect ratio (1989–2003 episodes are presented in 1.78:1 (16:9)). The set contains 35 discs and is presented in a faux-wooden cigar box. It features a brochure with episode details, and a script for the Japanese version of Prescription: Murder. Special features include the original 96-minute version of Étude In Black and the original NBC Mystery Movie title sequence. In addition, many episodes include isolated music and sound-effects tracks. Before this set's release, only the episodes up to Murder, a Self-Portrait were released on DVD in Japan.

Other appearances

Stage 

The Columbo character first appeared on stage in 1962 in Prescription: Murder with Thomas Mitchell in the role of Columbo.

In 2010, Prescription: Murder was revived for a tour of the United Kingdom with Dirk Benedict and later John Guerrasio as Columbo.

Television 
Falk appeared as Columbo in an Alias sketch produced for a 2003 TV special celebrating the 50th anniversary of ABC.

Falk appeared in character as Columbo in 1977 at The Dean Martin Celebrity Roast of Frank Sinatra.

Books 
Bernard Courtebras, "La femme du lieutenant", Nombre7, The life of Mrs Columbo's wife.  

A Columbo series of books was published by MCA Publishing, written by authors Alfred Lawrence, Henry Clements and Lee Hays. This series of books, with the first title published in 1972, was mostly adapted from the TV series.

Columbo was also used as the protagonist for a series of novels published between 1994 and 1999 by Forge Books, an imprint of Tor Books. All of these books were written by William Harrington.

William Link, the co-creator of the series, wrote a collection of Columbo short stories, titled The Columbo Collection, which was published in May 2010 by Crippen & Landru, the specialty mystery publisher.

Sculpture 

A statue of Lieutenant Columbo and his dog was unveiled in 2014 on Miksa Falk Street in Budapest, Hungary. According to Antal Rogán, then-district mayor of the city, Peter Falk may have been related to Hungarian writer and politician Miksa Falk, although there is no evidence yet to prove it.

Mrs. Columbo spin-off 

Mrs. Columbo, a spin-off TV series starring Kate Mulgrew, aired in 1979 and was canceled after only thirteen episodes. Lt. Columbo was never seen on Mrs. Columbo; each episode featured the resourceful Mrs. Columbo solving a murder mystery she encountered in her work as a newspaper reporter. Connections with the original Columbo series were made obvious: the glaring presence of Columbo's car in the driveway, the dog and Mrs. Columbo emptying ashtrays containing the famous green cigar butts—all featured in the show's opening sequence. References were also made to Kate's husband being a police lieutenant.

The Trivia Encyclopedia lawsuit 
Columbo's first name is notably never mentioned in the series, but "Frank Columbo" or "Lt. Frank Columbo" can occasionally be seen on his police ID. This ambiguity surrounding Columbo's first name led to the creator of The Trivia Encyclopedia, Fred L. Worth, to include a false entry that listed "Phillip Columbo" as Columbo's full name as a copyright trap. When the board game Trivial Pursuit included "Phillip" as the answer to the question, "What was Columbo's first name?", Worth launched a 300 million dollar lawsuit against the creators of the game. The creators of the game argued that while they did use The Trivia Encyclopedia as one of their sources, facts are not copyrightable and there was nothing improper about using an encyclopedia in the production of a fact-based game. The district court judge agreed and the decision was upheld by the United States Court of Appeals for the Ninth Circuit in September 1987. Worth petitioned the Supreme Court of the United States to review the case, but the Court declined, denying certiorari in March 1988.

See also 
 Furuhata Ninzaburō, a Japanese television series often referred to as the Japanese version of Columbo

References

External links 

Columbophile
Ultimate Columbo Site

 
American detective television series
1968 American television series debuts
2003 American television series endings
1960s American drama television series
1970s American crime drama television series
1980s American crime drama television series
1990s American crime drama television series
2000s American crime drama television series
1960s American crime television series
1970s American mystery television series
1980s American mystery television series
1990s American mystery television series
2000s American mystery television series
1970s American police procedural television series
1980s American police procedural television series
1990s American police procedural television series
2000s American police procedural television series
Best Drama Series Golden Globe winners
Edgar Award-winning works
Primetime Emmy Award for Outstanding Miniseries winners
Primetime Emmy Award-winning television series
Fictional portrayals of the Los Angeles Police Department
Television shows set in Los Angeles
American television films
American Broadcasting Company original programming
NBC Mystery Movie
NBC original programming
Television series by Universal Television
Television series by Stephen J. Cannell Productions
English-language television shows
The ABC Mystery Movie
Television series created by William Link
Television series created by Richard Levinson